Venice-Lido Airport is an aerodrome located  east of Venice (Venezia), a city in the Veneto region in Italy. It is situated on the north end of the island of Lido di Venezia. It is also known as Giovanni Nicelli Airport, after Sgt. Giovanni Nicelli (born 1893), an ace of the Italian Air Force, and was formerly known as Venice-San Nicolò Airport.

The aerodrome is operated by Nicelli S.p.A. and administered by the Italian Civil Aviation Authority (ENAC) of Venice. The air traffic service (ATS) authority is ENAV.

Facilities 

See also 
 Venice-Tessera Airport (Marco Polo Airport)

References

External links 
 Venezia Lido LIPV - WikiAirports
 Aeroporto Nicelli
 Venice Lido Airport
 
 

Airports in Veneto
Airports established in 1926
1926 establishments in Italy
20th-century establishments in Venice